Beka Kavtaradze (born 9 July 1990) is a Georgian water polo player for VK Dinamo Tbilisi and the Georgian national team.

He participated at the 2014 2016 2018 2020Men's European Water Polo Championship.

References

1990 births
Living people
Male water polo players from Georgia (country)